Wilhelm Werner Kurt von Priesdorff (19 October 1881 in Berlin – 5 September 1967 in Naumburg) was a Prussian officer, his last rank was Major, as well as a Geheimer Regierungsrat (executive council), military historian and author.

Awards
 Prussian Order of the Crown 4th Class
 Order of Saint John (Bailiwick of Brandenburg)
 Knight 2nd Class of the Order of Albert the Bear
 Order of Henry the Lion 4th Class

External links
 
 

1881 births
1967 deaths
Military personnel from Berlin
German military historians
German Army personnel of World War I